Alex Kemp is a National Football League (NFL) official. He wears uniform number 55. He entered the league in the  season as a side judge and was promoted to referee for the  season following the retirements of Ed Hochuli and Jeff Triplette.

Alex Kemp is the son of former NFL referee Stan Kemp.

2022 crew 
 R: Alex Kemp
 U: Mike Morton
 DJ: Danny Short
 LJ: Jeff Bergman
 FJ: John Jenkins
 SJ: Dale Shaw
 BJ: Scott Helverson
 RO: Mike Chase
 RA: Jamie Alfieri-Tuss

References

National Football League officials
Living people
Year of birth missing (living people)